The 1855 Grand National was the 17th renewal of the Grand National horse race that took place at Aintree near Liverpool, England, on 7 March 1855.

The race was marred by the fatal fall of former winner, Miss Mowbray, who suffered a broken back and neck when taking off too soon at Becher's Brook on the second circuit.

Finishing Order

Non-finishers

References

 1855
Grand National
Grand National
19th century in Lancashire
March 1855 sports events